Etiocholane, also known as 5β-androstane or 5-epiandrostane, is an androstane (C19) steroid. It is the 5β-isomer of androstane. Etiocholanes include 5β-androstanedione, 5β-dihydrotestosterone, 3α,5β-androstanediol, 3β,5β-androstanediol, etiocholanolone, epietiocholanolone, and 3α,5β-androstanol.

17β-Ethyletiocholanes, or 5β-pregnanes, include 5β-dihydroprogesterone, pregnanolone, and epipregnanolone, as well as pregnanediol and pregnanetriol.

See also
 C19H32

References

Etiocholanes